Gershman is a surname, and may refer to:

 Alexander Gershman (born 1961), American surgeon
 Anita Gershman, American film producer
 Carl Gershman (born 1943), President of the National Endowment for Democracy 
 Michael Gershman (1941–2000), American writer and music producer
 Michael Gershman (director), American cinematographer
 Suzy Gershman (1948–2012), American author
 Zhenya Gershman (born 1975), American artist